Ta-Be-Ta tales also known as Zizigulu is an Iranian television series directed by Marzieh Boroumand. This series began in the early 1994, and aired on Iranian television until the spring of 1995.

Summary 

Zizigulu is a pink-colored fictional character who is believed to have resided on the planet Ta-be-Ta before ending up on Earth and was adopted by Leyli Rashidi and Agha Y Pedar, a newlywed couple. Her full name is "Zizigulu Aasi Paasi Deraakutaa Taa-be-Taa" which she often uses to disappear and appear in certain areas, however she is sometimes referred to as "Aasi-Poolika" and "Zizinghuli".

The show ran for a total of 30 episodes before its cancellation.

References

External links 
 
 (Persian link)
 in Dehkhoda Dictionary
 in Youtube

Children's comedy television series
Fictional duos
Iranian animated television series
Iranian television series
1990s Iranian television series
1994 Iranian television series debuts
1995 Iranian television series endings
1990s animated television series